Shoaib Ahmed (born May 3, 1964) is an Indian Software Evangelist and TED Speaker. He was the President of Tally Solutions, the leading Indian Financial ERP system with over 1 million clients and a worldwide presence in 100 countries. He was nominated by his peers in the Indian Retail industry for the Economic Times Now 'Retail Leadership Award' and was a member of the Regional Council of NASSCOM, and a Founding Member & Fellow of iSPIRT, the Indian Software Products Industry Round Table, think tank for the Indian Software Products Industry

He is now incubating Catalystor – an enterprise with the intent to make technology effective for businesses.

Early life and education 

Ahmed, born in Bangalore in the State of Karnataka, is the son of the Late Honourable Justice S.M.Sait of the Karnataka High Court. Justice Sait, was also Secretary of the Karnataka State Hockey Association and Secretary General of the Indian Hockey Federation. Shoaib did his degree in St. Josephs College, Bangalore, and post graduation from the Indian Institute of Management, Calcutta.

Software evangelism

Ahmed, in addition to his role as President of Tally, is actively involved in mentoring software products and entrepreneurs in India. As a Fellow in ISPIRIT, he leads the Software Adoption Initiative (SAI). He actively mentors startups both as a member of the Indian Angel Network and through CIIE – Centre for Innovation, Incubation & Entrepreneurship at Indian Institute of Management (IIM) Ahmedabad. He is on the advisory committee of the Glocal University and was a member of the regional council of NASSCOM

Entrepreneurship and awards

Ahmed started as an entrepreneur by co-founding his own company, Vedha Automations, which developed a unique Point of Sale (POS) retail product – Shopper, later acquired by Tally in 2005. Ahmed received the Economic Times Now 'Retail Leadership Award' in February 2013. He was nominated by his peers in the Indian Retail Industry.

References

1964 births
Living people
Businesspeople from Bangalore